Paul Morgan (October 1, 1886 – December 10, 1938) was a Jewish Austrian actor and Kabarett performer. He died in Buchenwald concentration camp in 1938.

Selected filmography
 The Gentleman Without a Residence (1915)
 The Mistress of the World, Part VI (1919)
 Countess Doddy (1919)
 Prostitution (1919)
 Around the World in Eighty Days (1919)
 Diamonds (1920)
 Respectable Women (1920)
 Kurfürstendamm (1920)
 Four Around a Woman (1921)
 Peter Voss, Thief of Millions (1921)
 Hedda Gabler (1925)
 The Girl with a Patron (1925)
 The Elegant Bunch (1925)
 Cock of the Roost (1925)
 Love and Trumpets (1925)
 The Flower Girl of Potsdam Square (1925)
 The Red Mouse (1926)
 Vienna - Berlin (1926)
 When She Starts, Look Out (1926)
 The Third Squadron (1926)
 Circus Romanelli (1926)
 The Bank Crash of Unter den Linden (1926)
 The Pride of the Company (1926)
 The World Wants To Be Deceived (1926)
 We'll Meet Again in the Heimat (1926)
 Darling, Count the Cash (1926)
 The Brothers Schellenberg (1926)
 The Queen of the Baths (1926)
 The Three Mannequins (1926)
 The Divorcée (1926)
 Trude (1926)
 The Schimeck Family (1926)
 We Belong to the Imperial-Royal Infantry Regiment (1926)
 Family Gathering in the House of Prellstein (1927)
 Radio Magic (1927)
 A Serious Case (1927)
 Break-in (1927)
 Heaven on Earth (1927)
 Schwester Veronica (1927)
 Dyckerpotts' Heirs (1928)
 Mikosch Comes In (1928)
 Mascots (1929)
 Sinful and Sweet (1929)
 Fräulein Else (1929)
 Miss Midshipman (1929)
 Fairground People (1930)
 Two Hearts in Waltz Time (1930)
 Rendezvous (1930)
 Vienna, City of Song (1930)
 Twice Married (1930)
 The Cabinet of Doctor Larifari (1930)
 Queen of the Night (1931)
 Casanova wider Willen (1931)
 Men Behind Bars (1931)
 Marriage with Limited Liability (1931)
 Poor as a Church Mouse (1931)
 Schubert's Dream of Spring (1931)
 Liebeskommando (1931)
 The Ladies Diplomat (1932)
 Holzapfel Knows Everything (1932)
 The Empress and I (1933)
 Catherine the Last (1936)

References

Bibliography
 Hardt, Ursula. From Caligari to California: Erich Pommer's Life in the International Film Wars. Berghahn Books, 1996.
 Jelavich, Peter. Berlin Cabaret. Harvard University Press, 1996.

External links

1886 births
1938 deaths
Austrian male film actors
Austrian male silent film actors
Austrian comedians
Male actors from Vienna
Austrian Jews who died in the Holocaust
Austrian people who died in Buchenwald concentration camp
20th-century Austrian male actors
Jewish Austrian male actors
20th-century comedians